Albert George Silvanus Biggs (24 May 1889 – 4 April 1954) was an Australian rules footballer who played for the St Kilda Football Club in the Victorian Football League (VFL).

Notes

External links 

1889 births
1954 deaths
Australian rules footballers from Bendigo
St Kilda Football Club players